Don't Just Stand There is the second full-length album from the Canadian band Haywire, released 1987.

Track listing

CD bonus track

2003 CD bonus track

Personnel
 Paul MacAusland - vocals
 David Rashed - keyboards and backing vocals
 Marvin Birt - guitars and backing vocals
 Ronnie Switzer - bass
 Sean Kilbride - drums and percussion

Additional musicians
 Backing vocals: Sheree Jeacocke

References

External links
 Dont' Just Stand There lyrics

1987 albums
Haywire (band) albums
Attic Records albums
Albums recorded at Metalworks Studios